Dr. Daniel Mejia Londoño is a Colombian economist and academic.  He was formerly the director for the Center for Studies on Safety and Drugs at the University of Los Andes, and former Secretary of Security for Bogotá, Colombia. He is one of the leading scholars in drug research in the world, particularly the impact of cocaine trade on third world countries. He currently teaches economics of Crime at Universidad de Los Andes. In 2015 he was one of 39 academics who lobbied the government against the use of glyphosates.

References

Living people
Academic staff of the University of Los Andes (Colombia)
Year of birth missing (living people)
Brown University alumni